Robert William Matheny (February 9, 1929 – June 30, 1978) was an American basketball player known for his All-American college career at the University of California, Berkeley.

Matheny played basketball at Lowell High School in San Francisco, then for a season at the City College of San Francisco before playing for California of the Pacific Coast Conference (now known as the Pac-12 Conference) starting the 1949–50 season. Matheny immediately moved into the starting lineup for the Golden Bears, averaging 7.5 points per game and running the offense from the point guard position. At the close of the year, he was named first-team all-conference in recognition of his play, the only sophomore so honored. Matheny's college career suffered a setback in that off-season, as he was diagnosed with polio and medically unable to play college basketball for two years. He played the 1951–52 season for the Oakland Atlas Engineers of the Amateur Athletic Union (AAU) before being cleared to return to Cal for the 1952–53 season. In 1952–53, Matheny averaged 11.9 points per game and was again honored as an all-conference pick. The following season, he raised his scoring average to 13.5 points per game and was named a third-team All-American by Look Magazine.

Matheny was drafted by the New York Knicks in the 1953 NBA draft, but never played in the league. He returned to AAU action after his college career, playing with the San Francisco Athletic Club.

Matheny died on June 30, 1978 of a brain ailment.

References

External links
College stats @ sports-reference.com

1929 births
1978 deaths
All-American college men's basketball players
Amateur Athletic Union men's basketball players
American men's basketball players
Basketball players from San Francisco
California Golden Bears men's basketball players
City College of San Francisco Rams men's basketball players
Lowell High School (San Francisco) alumni
New York Knicks draft picks
Point guards